Nadia Negm (born July 23, 1998) is an Egyptian rower. She placed 24th in the women's single sculls event at the 2016 Summer Olympics.

References

1998 births
Living people
Egyptian female rowers
Olympic rowers of Egypt
Rowers at the 2016 Summer Olympics